Type I site-specific deoxyribonuclease (type I restriction enzyme, deoxyribonuclease (ATP- and S-adenosyl-L-methionine-dependent), restriction-modification system, deoxyribonuclease (adenosine triphosphate-hydrolyzing), adenosine triphosphate-dependent deoxyribonuclease, ATP-dependent DNase, type 1 site-specific deoxyribonuclease) is an enzyme. This enzyme catalyses the following chemical reaction

 Endonucleolytic cleavage of DNA to give random double-stranded fragments with terminal 5'-phosphates; ATP is simultaneously hydrolysed

They have an absolute requirement for ATP (or dATP) and S-adenosyl-L-methionine.

See also 
 Restriction enzyme

References

External links 
 

EC 3.1.21